Port Egmont (Spanish: Puerto de la Cruzada; French: Poil de la Croisade) was the first British settlement in the Falkland Islands, on Saunders Island off West Falkland, and is named after the Earl of Egmont.

Toponym
The original name for the settlement was Jason's Town and the term Port Egmont referred to the body of water encompassed by Saunders Island, Keppel Island and the main island of West Falkland.  Fort George was the small garrison established nearby. The details of the settlement are included on a map drawn by Carrington Bowles and first published in 1770; only one known copy remains.

History

Port Egmont was established in on 25 January 1765, by an expedition led by Commodore John Byron consisting of the boats ,  and HMS Florida. The expedition left a watering place and a vegetable garden.

Another expedition arrived around a year later in January 1766, led by Captain John MacBride, with the ships ,  and HMS Experiment after which Carcass Island and the Jason Islands are named. This was to secure possession, and McBride ordered one of the ships to stay at Port Egmont, and develop the settlement, resulting in several permanent buildings and a garrison. MacBride, in command of HMS Jason, carried out the first hydrographic survey of the Falklands in 1766 and discovered a number of minor islands including Weddell, Beaver and New Islands off the southwest extremity of the archipelago. The chart based on that survey was one of the most accurate for its time. MacBride also made the first systematic meteorological observations in the Falklands.

The next few years resulted in conflicting claims with the French and Spanish, with the British using Port Egmont as a basis for their claim. In early 1770 Spanish commander Don Juan Ignacio de Madariaga briefly visited Port Egmont. He returned from Argentina on 10 June with five armed ships and 1400 soldiers forcing the British to leave Port Egmont. 

In 1771, after threats of war with Spain, the colony was re-established by Captain John Stott with the ships , HMS Hound and HMS Florida, the latter being at the founding of the original settlement. The port became an important stop for ships going around Cape Horn

In 1774, Britain abandoned many of its overseas garrisons for economic reasons and Port Egmont was no exception due to the result of the American Revolution. In 1776, the British forces left leaving a lead plate stating that the island was still a British possession.  The colony was immediately taken over by sealers but in 1780 the buildings were destroyed under orders from Spanish authorities.

See also
 Port Saint Louis, the first settlement on the islands (by French colonists)

Notes

External links

 Falkland History
 Samuel Johnson on Port Egmont

Populated places in the Falkland Islands
Populated places established in 1765
History of the Falkland Islands
1765 establishments in the British Empire
1765 establishments in the Falkland Islands